Eduard Holst (1843 – 4 February 1899) was a Danish playwright, composer, actor, dancer, and dance master. His name is spelled sometimes Edward Holst or Edvard Holst.

Holst was born in Copenhagen.  His compositions include songs and piano solo works. He was very prolific and a 1907 biography states he produced over two thousand works. He died in New York City.

Works
Ilma, Grande Valse de Concert (1878) (later republished/renamed in the U.S. as "Diana")
Bloom & Blossom, a Waltz (1887)
Autumn Leaf, a Polka for Children (1887) 
Dance of The Demon (Grand Galop de Concert) (1888) 
Shower of Melodies, part of a six work series for children
Our National Guardsmen, ded. to: Col. Emmons Clark 7th Regiment N.G.S.N.Y. (1889)
Follow Me (March) (1890)
La Tanda (Spanish Dance) (1892)
Young Hearts (Polka) (1892)
Marine Band March (1893)
Lily Waltz (1895)
Violet Galop (1895)
Lilac York Dance (1895)
Carnation March (1895)
Pansy Polka (1895)
Rose Gavotte (1895)
Brocken Revels (Grand Galop De Concert) (1896)
Our Flats, a comic opera, premiered in 1897 in New York
Bicycle Race (Galop) (1897) 
Shooting Stars Galop (1897)
Battle of Manila (1898)
Hot Water, a comedy
The Little Maid in Pink
Boys of Columbia (Two Step)
Danse Espanola
March of the Dwarfs
Sweet Clover Waltz
Revel of the Witches

Public domain sheet music
  Eduard Holst Sheet Music Search, Library of Congress, Performing Arts Encyclopedia
  Eduard Holst Sheet Music Search, Levy Sheet Music Collection, Johns Hopkins University
  IN harmony search, Indiana University
 

1843 births
1899 deaths
Danish classical composers
Danish male classical composers
Danish opera composers
Male opera composers
19th-century classical composers
19th-century Danish composers
19th-century male musicians
Danish expatriates in the United States